W.A.K.O. World Championships 2001 may refer to:

 W.A.K.O. World Championships 2001 (Belgrade)
 W.A.K.O. World Championships 2001 (Maribor)